The Roussos Phenomenon (or Excerpts from "The Roussos Phenomenon") is an EP by Demis Roussos.

It was the only number one hit in the UK Singles Chart for Demis Roussos, spending a single week at the top of the charts in July 1976, and the sole EP to reach the top of the charts that decade. 

The EP's track listing included "Forever and Ever", "So Dreamy", and "My Friend the Wind" written by Stélios Vlavianós and Robert Costandinos, as well as "Sing an Ode to Love" written by Stélios Vlavianós, Charalampe Chalkitis and Robert Costandinos. The EP was produced by Roussos.

The lead track "Forever and Ever" was later spoofed by Kenny Everett on his television show. It was recorded and released as a single by Engelbert Humperdinck in 1975.

Certifications and sales

References

External links
 UK charts 1975-1979

UK Singles Chart number-one singles
1976 EPs
Demis Roussos albums